France 5 is a French free-to-air public television channel, part of the France Télévisions group. Principally featuring educational programming, the channel's motto is la chaîne de la connaissance et du savoir (the knowledge network). In contrast to the group's two main channels, France 2 and France 3, France 5 concentrates almost exclusively on factual programming, documentaries, and discussions – 3,925 hours of documentaries were broadcast in 2003 – with fiction confined to one primetime slot of around two hours' duration on Monday evenings.

France 5 airs 24 hours a day. Earlier – before completion of the switchover to digital broadcasting on 29 November 2011 – the channel's analogue frequencies had carried the programmes of the Franco-German cultural channel Arte between 19.00 each evening and 3.00 the following morning.

History

It was launched on 28 March 1994 as a temporary channel under the name Télé emploi (Teleworking), more than one year after France's first privately owned free television network, La Cinq, suffered a financial collapse and ceased operations on 12 April 1992. La Cinquième started broadcasting on 13 December 1994 with a mix of small educational programs, during the hours not used by Arte (which launched less than 2 months after La Cinq's closure).

La Cinquième was integrated in the new France Télévisions public holding in 2000, which gathered Antenne 2 (since renamed France 2) and FR3 (France Régions 3, since renamed France 3); it would be rebranded as France 5 on 7 January 2002. France 5 broadcasting hours have been extended to 24 hours a day, initially available only on cable and satellite, and since spring 2005 on air within the new digital broadcasting multiplex "R1" network that supports all national public TV channels. Analogue transmitters were switched off in 2011.

Logos

Subsidiary
 La Cinquième Développement - former company, active from 1995 to 2001, wholly owned subsidiary of La Cinquième, responsible for managing telephone services, Minitel, Internet, Teletext, and market a selection of programs of the chain on all media. These services were taken over by France Télévisions subsidiaries at the end of 2000.

See also 
 List of documentary channels

References

External links 

 Official Site  

05
French-language television stations
Television stations in France
Television channels and stations established in 1994
Educational and instructional television channels
1994 establishments in France